The Ilan Ramon Youth Physics Center was established in honor of Ilan Ramon, Israel's first astronaut. The center was established in 2007 by the Rashi foundation in order to allow high school students that are interested in physics access to high grade laboratory and astronomy equipment. The center is located at the Ben Gurion University of the Negev and hosts students of all ages and of a wide cultural variety.

The objectives of the Center are to advance the study of physics and astronomy in high school; increase the number of pupils who take Physics at matriculation level and improve their matriculation results; establish and operate physics centers in school increase the number of physics and engineering students in academic institutions.

Astronomical equipment

MEADE LX200R 16" robotic telescope, used for research.
GOTO E5 planetarium, used for showing the night sky
MEADE LightSwitch 8"
Meade LightBridge 10"
MEADE ETX-125 PE
Coronado PST solar telescope, used for daytime observations

Laboratory equipment
The laboratories are equipped with a variety of physics experiment kits, for both modern and classical physics.

See also
 List of astronomical observatories

References

External links
 Official site
 About the winner of the first place in the international "First Step to Nobel Prize in Physics" research project competition

Astronomy education
Astronomical observatories in Israel
Ben-Gurion University of the Negev
2007 establishments in Israel
Space program of Israel